The 1998 Monmouth Hawks football team represented Monmouth University in the 1998 NCAA Division I-AA football season as a member of the Northeast Conference (NEC). The Hawks were led by sixth-year head coach Kevin Callahan and played their home games at Kessler Field. They finished the season 5–5 overall and 4–1 in NEC play to share the conference championship with Robert Morris. Though they finished atop the conference standings, the Hawks’ poor non-conference record prohibited them from receiving a spot in the postseason.

Schedule

References

Monmouth
Monmouth Hawks football seasons
Northeast Conference football champion seasons
Monmouth Hawks football